The thumb is the first digit of the human hand.

Thumb or Thumbs may also refer to:

Computing
 ARM Thumb, an instruction encoding and corresponding execution mode for the ARM architecture
 Thumb, shorthand for thumbnail, a reduced version of an image

Entertainment
Thumb (band), a German rapcore band
"Thumb", a song by Dinosaur Jr. from the album Green Mind (1991)
"Thumb, a song by Kyuss album from the Blues for the Red Sun (1992)
"Thumb", a song by M Huncho from the album Huncholini the 1st (2020)
Thumbs (mixtape), a 2015 mixtape by Busdriver
"Thumbs" (song), a 2017 song by Sabrina Carpenter
Thumbs!, a series of film parodies
The Thumbs, an American punk rock band

Places

Canada
 The Thumb (mountain), a mountain in the Lower Mainland of British Columbia
 The Thumb (Omineca), a mountain in the Omineca Country of British Columbia

United States
 The Thumb (California), a mountain in the Sierra Nevada of California
 The Thumb, a region in Michigan
 Thumb Lake, aka Lake Louise in Hudson Township, Charlevoix County, Michigan
 Thumb Mountain, in New Hampshire

Elsewhere
 Thumb Peak (Palawan), a small mountain in central Palawan, Philippines
 The Thumbs (Tasmania), Tasmanian islet, Australia

People
 General Tom Thumb (1838–1883), stage name of Charles Sherwood Stratton, a dwarf who achieved great fame
 Tom Thumb (disambiguation)
 Peter Thumb (1681–1767), Austrian architect whose family came from the Vorarlberg

Other uses 
 Thumb (backhoe), a thumb-like metal bar hinged to a backhoe's scoop

See also 
 THUMS Islands
 Thumb Bandits, video game TV show
 Thumb Candy, video game TV show
 Hop-o'-My-Thumb, a folk tale
 Rule of thumb, an informal rule
 Thumb signal, a hand gesture
 Devils Thumb, a mountain between Alaska and British Columbia